Daniel Gooi Zi Sen (born on 11 June 1987 -) is a Malaysian politician from DAP. He is also the branch Chairman of Chemor Lane for Democratic Action Party. In 2018 Malaysian general election, he was filled to contest for the Pengkalan Kota seat as DAP's youngest candidate in the general election under the flag of PKR.

Background 
Gooi is born on 11 June 1987 in Bukit Mertajam, Penang. His father is Gooi Seong Xin and mother is Tong Li Chin. His uncle, Gooi Seong Kin, currently special coordinator for the Chief Minister of Penang, represented DAP to contest in the 1995 Malaysian general election for the Berapit state seat. He studied in SJK (C) Kim Sen and Jit Sin High School. He has also studied Tourism Management in Universiti Malaysia Sabah.

Political career 
Gooi's uncle, Gooi Seong Kin had used their house as his campaign center in the 1995 Malaysian general election and Gooi admires Lim Kit Siang since he was young. After he graduated from Universiti Malaysia Sabah in 2009, he joined DAP in 2010 and served in by-then Penang State Executive Councilor for Tourism, Law Heng Kiang's office. He is the project planner for DAP Penang from 2012 to 2013. After the 2013 Malaysian general election, he was the special officer for the  Penang State Executive Councilor for Housing, Jagdeep Singh Deo.

In 2018 Malaysian general election, he was filled to contest for the Pengkalan Kota seat as DAP's youngest candidate in the general election under the flag of PKR. He successfully defeated the other candidates and become the Member of Penang State Legislative Assembly for Pengkalan Kota.

Election results

External links

Reference 

Democratic Action Party (Malaysia) politicians
Members of the Penang State Legislative Assembly
Malaysian people of Chinese descent
Articles containing Chinese-language text
1987 births
Living people